Spent caustic is a waste industrial caustic solution that has become exhausted and is no longer useful (or spent). Spent caustics are made of sodium hydroxide or potassium hydroxide, water, and contaminants.  The contaminants have consumed the majority of the sodium (or potassium) hydroxide and thus the caustic liquor is spent, for example, in one common application H2S (gas) is scrubbed by the NaOH (aqueous) to form NaHS (aq) and H2O (l), thus consuming the caustic.

Types
 Ethylene spent caustic comes from the caustic scrubbing of cracked gas from an ethylene cracker.  This liquor is produced by a caustic scrubbing tower.  Ethylene product gas is contaminated with (g) and (g), and those contaminants are removed by absorption in the caustic scrubbing tower to produce (aq) and (aq). The sodium hydroxide is consumed and the resulting wastewater (ethylene spent caustic) is contaminated with the sulfides and carbonates and a small fraction of organic compounds.
Refinery spent caustic comes from multiple sources: the Merox processing of gasoline; the Merox processing of kerosene/jet fuel; and the caustic scrubbing/Merox processing of LPG. In these streams sulfides and organic acids are removed from the product streams into the caustic phase. The sodium hydroxide is consumed and the resulting wastewaters (cresylic for gasoline; naphthenic for kerosene/jet fuel; sulfidic for LPG -spent caustics) are often mixed and called refinery spent caustic. This spent caustic is contaminated with sulfides, carbonates, and in many cases a high fraction of organic acids.

Treatment technologies
Spent caustics are malodorous wastewaters that are difficult to treat in conventional wastewater processes. Typically the material is disposed of by high dilution with biotreatment, deep well injection, incineration, wet air oxidation, Humid Peroxide Oxidation or other speciality processes. Most ethylene spent caustics are disposed of through wet air oxidation.

References
Suarez, F. "Pluses and Minuses of Caustic Treating", Hydrocarbon Processing, pp 117–123, Oct 1996.
Maugans, C.; Ellis, C. "Age Old Solution for Today's SO2 and NOx", Pollution Engineering, April 2004.
Carlos T.; Maugans, C. "Wet Air Oxidation of Refinery Spent Caustic: A Refinery Case Study", NPRA Conference, San Antonio, TX, September 2000.  WAO for Refinery Spent Caustic
Kumfer, B.; Felch, C.; Maugans, C. "Wet Air Oxidation of Spent Caustic in Petroleum Refineries", NPRA, March 2010, San Antonio, TX.  WAO for Spent Caustic in Petroleum Refineries

Water pollution
Waste